Ruler  is a 2019 Indian Telugu-language action drama film, produced by C. Kalyan under CK Entertainments & Happy Movies banners and directed by K. S. Ravikumar and . starring Nandamuri Balakrishna, Vedhika, Sonal Chauhan, Bhumika Chawla, and music composed by Chirantan Bhatt.

The film received negative reviews from critics and audience for the outdated story and screenplay, music, Double entendres, and illogical scenes, and was a box office bomb.

Plot
The film begins in 1987 when the crime rate in Uttar Pradesh peaks. The Agricultural Minister, Veerandranath Tagore, brings out a resolution to develop farming, as crime can be reduced by eradicating hunger. He gives a call for 500 farmers from Combined Andhra Pradesh lead by the wise Seetaramaiah. The Government allocates them 5000 acres of land on lease for 30 years, thereafter, it will be their own.

Years roll by, and Sarojini Naidu, a business tycoon proceeds toward Uttar Pradesh to start her new industrial plant. On the way, she spots a stranger with multiple stab wounds. Sarojini Naidu admits him to the hospital, and within the next minute, she accompanies him to the ICU due to a heart attack. Here, Sarojini Naidu is facing a serious threat from her brother-in-law, Durga Prasad, when the stranger miraculously wakes up from the coma and saves her. Learning that the person has completely lost his memory, Sarojini Naidu adopts him by giving his the identity of her deceased son Arjun Prasad. After 2 years, Arjun Prasad became a famous IT magnate. Harika, the chairman of a rival company, tries to overpower Arjun Prasad when she falls for him. Meanwhile, the Telugu farmers in Uttar Pradesh are under severe hardship from local politician Bhavaninath Tagore.

Sandhya, who is shown as the love interest of Arjun Prasad in the past, files a complaint when the Govt appoints a special judiciary committee. But unfortunately, when they walk in, Bhavaninath Tagore falsifies the narrative by intimidating the villagers and also claims Sandhya is insane. At the same time, Arjun Prasad reveals that the Uttar Pradesh project has been jeopardized by Bhavaninath Tagore, who also humiliated Sarojini Naidu. Now, enraged Arjun Prasad speaks against Bhavaninath Tagore and restarts his plant. At that moment, the henchmen of Bhavaninath Tagore attack Arjun Prasad, whose blood runs cold after seeing him. Simultaneously, all the Telugu villagers eagerly approach and claim him as Dharma.
  
Thereupon the villagers start narrating the past, and Dharma is a powerful police officer, the son of Seetaramaiah, who stands for justice. Niranjana Prasad, daughter of Veerandranath Tagore, loves and marries a lower caste guy, which her father heartily welcomes. During their wedding reception, Bhavaninath Tagore, the younger brother of Veerandranath Tagore, murders the bridegroom and also attempts to kill pregnant Niranjana Prasad using his racism and vote bank. All at once, Dharma arrives, rescues, and shields them in the village through Telugu farmers as gratitude. Meanwhile, avenged Bhavaninath Tagore clouts and issued a G.O to repeal the lease agreement. Veerandranath Tagore abides in the farmers' agony, so, they leave the village. First, he asks Niranjana Prasad to stand by at the railway station and approach Bhavaninath Tagore with an appeal for the cancellation of the G.O.

However, a bloodthirsty Bhavaninath Tagore kills him and orders his henchmen to eliminate Niranjana Prasad. Tracing her whereabouts, Dharma arrives on a train on time. In the fight, he is severely injured and wiped out, and at this juncture, he is witnessed by Sarojini Naidu. In a flash, the story turns to the present when Sarojini Naidu also affirms him as Dharma, but he cannot recall his memory. Nevertheless, he decides to encounter Bhavaninath Tagore when his heart is felt with joy, knowing that Niranjana Prasad is safeguarded by the villagers and she has given birth to a baby boy named Dharma. At last, Dharma / Arjun Prasad knocks out Bhavaninath Tagore, permanently allows the lands to the farmers, and declares Niranjana Prasad as the original heir of the Tagore dynasty. Finally, Sarojini Naidu departs with Harika bequeathing Dharma / Arjun Prasad as his necessity is more to the public than her business empire.

Cast

 Nandamuri Balakrishna as Dharma / Arjun Prasad
 Prakash Raj as Veerandranath Tagore
 Vedhika as Sandhya
 Sonal Chauhan as Harika
 Bhumika Chawla as Niranjana Prasad, Veerendranath Tagore's Daughter 
 Jayasudha as Sarojini Naidu
 Shataf Figar as Bhavaninath Tagore
 Sayaji Shinde as Durga Prasad
 Nagineedu as Seetaramaiah
 Chalapathi Rao as Subba Rao
 Raghu Karumanchi as Arnold 
 Dhanraj as Jackie Chan
 Srinivasa Reddy as Krishna Reddy
 Jhansi as Village member
 Raghu Babu
 Saptagiri
 Parag Tyagi as Bhavaninath's Henchmen
 Rajiv Kumar Aneja as Police Commissioner

Soundtrack

Music was composed by Chirantan Bhatt. Music released by Aditya Music Company.

Production
The principal photography of the film started in July in Bangkok. The second schedule was completed in Ramoji Film City in October 2019. A melody Song is picturized on Balakrishna & Vedhika in November at Munnar.

Release 
The film  released on 20 December 2019. The first look teaser on 21 November 2019 and trailer on 8 December 2019. The first single song  Adugadugo Action Hero is released on 1 December 2019. Accordingly, the pre-release event held on 14 December 2019, at the MGM Grounds, VUDA Park, Visakhapatnam.

Reception
Ruler received negative reviews from critics. Y. Sunita Chowdary of The Hindu stated that the film was purely for the fans. "Balakrishna fans will like him in any form and indeed made some effort to look different, gives Vedhika returns after a long time to perform in a better role. The hero gets elevated at each level and it becomes a tale of heroic exploits and nothing else," she added. The Times of India  critic Suhas Yellapantula gave 1.5/5 stars, and called it a "disappointing fare." He wrote: " A non-existent plot, poor characterization, and amateurish filmmaking ensures this film is a big miss. 123telugu.com also gave the same rating and wrote: "The concept is old school and unnecessary scenes, the second half could be avoided totally. The director KS Ravikumar has been stuck in a time warp being unable to move on from his outdated concepts. Although Balayya impresses with his posh look, the angry cop look is very underwhelming with the horrible wig, which disappoints the general audience. A reviewer from The Hans India affirmed that the film doesn't have a proper storyline, "Director KS Ravikumar used the same commercial formula for this movie and even the story and screenplay are also not that gripping," they wrote.

References

External links 
 

2010s Telugu-language films
2019 action films
Indian action drama films
Films shot in Bangkok
Indian police films
Films shot at Ramoji Film City
2010s police films